Galatasaray Women's Water Polo Team is the water polo team of the Turkish sports club Galatasaray S.K.

In 2012, Galatasaray Men's Water Polo Team won Turkish Water Polo Championship Cup.

Current squad
As of August 12, 2012

Domestic success

Türkiye Sutopu 1. Ligi
Winners (1): 2012

References

External links
Galatasaray SK Official Web Site 

Water polo clubs in Turkey
2009 establishments in Turkey
Galatasaray Water polo
Galatasaray S.K. (women's water polo)

de:Galatasaray Istanbul (Wasserball)